"Gang Gang" is a song by British YouTuber and rapper KSI from his second studio album, All Over the Place (2021). The song features guest appearances from British artists Jay1 and Deno. It was co-produced by AJ Productions and Jacob Manson. The song premiered in Fortnite in June 2021 and was later released for digital download and streaming by RBC Records and BMG on 16 July 2021. "Gang Gang" debuted at number 40 on the UK Singles Chart and number 53 on the Irish Singles Chart.

Credits and personnel 
Credits adapted from Tidal.

 KSIsongwriting, vocals
 Jay1songwriting, vocals
 Denosongwriting, vocals
 AJ Productionsproduction, songwriting
 Jacob Mansonproduction, songwriting
 Eight9FLYsongwriting
 S-Xsongwriting
 Adam Lunnengineering
 Joe LaPortaengineering
 Kevin Graingerengineering
 Matt Schwartzengineering
 Niko Marzoucaengineering
 Rob MacFarlaneengineering
 Robert Marksengineering

Charts

Release history

References 

2021 songs
KSI songs
Songs written by KSI
Songs written by Jacob Manson
Songs written by S-X